The Democrats  (abbreviated LD) is a political party in Gabon.

The party was established in Libreville in March 2017 by members of the collapsed Alliance for the New Gabon (ANG). It is chaired by the former Speaker of the National Assembly Guy Nzouba Ndama. The party won 11 seats in the 2018 parliamentary elections, which made it the biggest opposition party. The party is a member of Gabon's Coalition for the New Republic (CNR).

References 

Political parties in Gabon
Political parties established in 2017
2017 establishments in Gabon